Lady Be Good ... For Ella is an album by pianist Tommy Flanagan featuring compositions associated with Ella Fitzgerald recorded in 1993 for the Groovin' High label.

Reception

AllMusic gave the album 4½ stars with Michael G. Nastos' review stating: "Although Flanagan has many high points in an exceptional career, this is certainly up there with the best, and a great set of Cliff Notes for doing the jazz piano trio right. Highly recommended".

Track listing
 "Oh, Lady Be Good!" (George Gershwin, Ira Gershwin) - 4:48
 "Love You Madly" (Duke Ellington) - 6:38
 "Isn't It a Pity?" (George Gershwin, Ira Gershwin) - 5:58
 "How High the Moon" (Morgan Lewis, Nancy Hamilton) - 5:37 	
 "Smooth Sailing" (Arnett Cobb) - 3:47
 "Alone Too Long" (Arthur Schwartz, Dorothy Fields) - 7:40 	
 "Angel Eyes" (Matt Dennis, Earl Brent) - 5:33
 "Cherokee" (Ray Noble) - 6:38
 "Rough Ridin'" (Ella Fitzgerald, Hank Jones) - 4:53
 "Pete Kelly's Blues" (Ray Heindorf, Sammy Cahn) - 5:28 	
 "Oh, Lady Be Good!" (George Gershwin, Ira Gershwin) - 3:52

Personnel 
Tommy Flanagan - piano
Peter Washington - bass 
Lewis Nash - drums

References 

1994 albums
Tommy Flanagan albums
Verve Records albums
Ella Fitzgerald tribute albums